RHCE may refer to:
 Red Hat Certified Engineer
 RHCE (gene), Rh blood group, CcEe antigens, a human gene